is a railway station on the Iida Line in the city of Iida, Nagano Prefecture, Japan, operated by Central Japan Railway Company (JR Central).

Lines
Tokimata Station is served by the Iida Line and is 119.3 kilometers from the starting point of the line at Toyohashi Station.

Station layout
The station consists of a two opposed ground-level side platforms connected by a level crossing. The station is unattended.

Platforms

Adjacent stations

History
Tokimata Station opened on 26 December 1927. With the privatization of Japanese National Railways (JNR) on 1 April 1987, the station came under the control of JR Central.

Passenger statistics
In fiscal 2015, the station was used by an average of 117 passengers daily (boarding passengers only).

Surrounding area
Tenryū River

See also
 List of railway stations in Japan

References

External links

 Tokimata Station information 

Railway stations in Nagano Prefecture
Railway stations in Japan opened in 1927
Stations of Central Japan Railway Company
Iida Line
Iida, Nagano